The Susu language is the language of the Susu or Soso people of Guinea and Sierra Leone, West Africa. It is in the Mande language family.

It is one of the national languages of Guinea and spoken mainly in the coastal region of the country.

History
The language was also used by people in the coastal regions of Guinea and Sierra Leone as a trade language.

The first literature in Susu was a translation of the first seven chapters of the Gospel of Matthew, translated by John Godfrey Wilhelm of the Church Mission Society.  This was published in London as "Lingjili Matthew" in 1816.  J.G. Wilhelm translated a considerable portion of the New Testament, but only this small part appears to have been printed.

Phonology

Grammatical sketch

Susu is an SOV language, Poss-N, N-D, generally suffixing, non-pro-drop, wh-in-situ, with no agreement affixes on the verb, no noun classes, no gender, and with a clitic plural marker which attaches to the last element of the NP (N or D, typically), but does not co-occur with numerals. It has no definite or indefinite articles. Sentential negation is expressed with a particle, mu, whose distribution is unclear (with adjectival predicates it seems to sometimes infix, but with transitive verbs it comes before the object).

Examples:

Pronouns

cf.

Object pronouns have the same form as subject pronouns: 

Possessive affixes precede the noun:

 baba "father":
 m baba "my father"
 i baba "your (sg) father"
 a baba "his/her/its father"
 wom baba "our father"
 wo baba "your (pl) father"
 e baba "their father"

Adverbs
Adverbs can precede the subject or follow the verb:

Grammatical number
NPs come in a variety of forms:

 khamé "boy (sg)", khame e "boys (pl)
 taami "bread (sg)", taami e "breads (pl)"

Numerals
 woto keren car one "one car"
 woto firin car two "two cars"
 woto sakhan "three cars"
 woto nani "four cars"
 woto suli "five cars"
 woto senni "six cars"
 woto solofere "seven cars"
 woto solomasakhan "eight cars"
 woto solomanani "nine cars"
 woto fu "ten cars"
 woto fu nun keren "eleven cars"
 woto fu nun firin "twelve cars"

 n woto nde e to né 1sg car indef.D pl see PAST "I saw several cars"/"J'ai vu des autos."
 woto nde "some car"
 di nde "some boy"
 bangkhi nde "some house"
 khame nde "someone"
 se nde "something"
 nde "who/some"
 i nde to? you who see "Who did you see?"
 i munse don ma? 2sg what eat PRES "What will you eat?"

Other
Sosoxui is closely related to the Yalunka language.

References

External links
 Portions of the Book of Common Prayer in Susu and English 1861 translation
 PanAfrican L10n page on Susu
 Susu alphabet and phonology
 Peace Corps Susu language manual

Mande languages
Languages of Guinea
Languages of Sierra Leone
Languages of Guinea-Bissau